Thailand participated in the 1986 Asian Games in Seoul on 20 September to 5 October 1990. Thailand ended the games at 26 overall medals including 3 gold medals.

Nations at the 1986 Asian Games
1986
Asian Games